Susan Hilliam (born 1941) is an English former cricketer who played as a bowler. She appeared in four One Day Internationals for England in the 1973 Women's Cricket World Cup. She took six wickets at 12.66 with a best performance of three wickets for six runs as England won the tournament. She played domestic cricket for Yorkshire.

References

External links
 
 

1941 births
Date of birth missing (living people)
Living people
People from Yorkshire
England women One Day International cricketers
Yorkshire women cricketers